Robert Lee Madison (March 8, 1911 – January 29, 1973) was an American Negro league pitcher between 1935 and 1942.

A native of Lillie, Louisiana, Madison made his Negro leagues debut in 1935 for the Kansas City Monarchs. He went on to play for the Memphis Red Sox and Birmingham Black Barons. Madison died in San Diego, California in 1973 at age 61.

References

External links
 and Baseball-Reference Black Baseball stats and Seamheads
 Robert Madison at Arkansas Baseball Encyclopedia

1911 births
1973 deaths
Birmingham Black Barons players
Kansas City Monarchs players
Memphis Red Sox players
Baseball pitchers
Baseball players from Louisiana
People from Union Parish, Louisiana
20th-century African-American sportspeople